The Himalayas class is a series of 5 container ships built for COSCO SHIPPING Lines. The ships have a maximum theoretical capacity of 14,566 TEU.

The ships were designed by Hudong Zhonghua and built by Shanghai Jiangnan Changxing Shipbuilding at their shipyard in Shanghai.

List of ships

References 

Container ship classes
Ships of COSCO Shipping